Consdorf is a commune and town in eastern Luxembourg. It is part of the canton of Echternach, which is part of the district of Grevenmacher.

, the town of Consdorf, which lies in the centre of the commune, has a population of 1,200.  Other towns within the commune include Scheidgen, Wolper and Breidweiler.

Population

References

External links

 https://www.consdorf.lu
 

Communes in Echternach (canton)
Towns in Luxembourg